Felix, Fortunatus, and Achilleus were 3rd-century Christian saints who suffered martyrdom during the reign of Caracalla. Felix, a priest, Fortunatus and Achilleus, both deacons, were sent by Irenaeus, to Valence, to convert the locals. It is said that they died .

Legends
Felix, Fortunatus and Achilleus were sent to Valence, by Saint Irenaeus of Lyon. From a humble lodging wherein they lived a life of much penance they evangelised the town.

They also performed many miracles in the area of Valence, and through their preaching many people were converted. This led to their arrest. They were freed from prison, by angels, who told them to destroy all the idols of the temples in Valence. So Felix, Fortunatus, and Achilleus, destroyed images of Mercury, Saturn, and a particularly valuable amber statue of Jupiter. For their actions the three were captured again, had their legs broken, followed by torture on wheels. Having survived all of these torments they were beheaded.

Although the individuals themselves may not be entirely legendary, no historical incidents of their lives have been preserved.

Veneration
Relics believed to be those of  Felix, Fortunatus, and Achilleus, are venerated in Valencia, Spain.

See also
 Other saints Felix
 Other saints Fortunatus

References

External links
Sts. Felix, Fortunatus, & Achilleus Catholic Online

212 deaths
Gallo-Roman saints
3rd-century Christian martyrs
3rd-century Christian clergy
Groups of Christian martyrs of the Roman era
Year of birth unknown
Angelic visionaries